Madhyanchal Gramin Bank is a regional rural bank in India. It is under the ownership of Ministry of Finance , Government of India. It was formed by merging three rural banks in the state of Madhya Pradesh in central India namely Madhya Bharat Bank, Sharda Grameen Bank, Rewa Sidhi Grameen Bank, sponsored by State Bank Of India, Allahabad Bank and Union Bank of India. Its headquarters is in Saugor. Current sponsor of the bank is State Bank of India. Madhyanchal Gramin Bank has presence over 13 districts in Madhya Pradesh Damoh, Sagar, Shivpuri, Guna, Ashoknagar, Tikamgarh, Chhatarpur, Panna, Satna, Rewa, Sidhi, Niwari and Singrauli. There are 454 branch and 7 regional offices in Rewa, Sidhi, Satna, Damoh, Shivpuri, Chhatarpur and Tikamgarh.

See also

 Banking in India
 List of banks in India
 Reserve Bank of India
 Regional Rural Bank
 Indian Financial System Code
 List of largest banks
 List of companies of India
 Make in India

References 

Economy of Madhya Pradesh
Banks established in 2012
Regional rural banks of India
2012 establishments in Madhya Pradesh
Indian companies established in 2012